For the school of the same name in Hartlepool, England, see St Francis RC Grammar School.

St. Francis' Grammar School is a private Catholic secondary school located in Baluchistan, Pakistan. The school is situated on the Zarghoon Road (formerly known as Lytton Road). The school has playgrounds, hostel facilities (till the 80s) and a well stocked children's library.

History
The school was founded in 1936 by Msgr. Salesius Lemmens OFM, Apostolic Prefect to educate the children of British soldiers stationed in the area. The school had the distinction of having Father Liberius Pieterse as Assistant Principal from 1937 to 1939  who translated the Bible into Urdu.

Alumni

 Major General Shakil Ahmed, Bangladesh Rifles
Mir Zafarullah Khan Jamali, former Prime Minister of Pakistan
Ashraf Jehangir Qazi, Pakistani diplomat
Muzaffar Hussain Shah, former Chief Minister of Sindh and Speaker of Sindh Assembly

References

External links
 School photograph by Dr Irfan Ahmed Khan, student (1961-1969)

Schools in Balochistan, Pakistan
Catholic secondary schools in Pakistan
Catholic elementary and primary schools in Pakistan
Quetta
1930s establishments in British India
Educational institutions established in 1936